Mozingo Creek is a stream in Nodaway County in the U.S. state of Missouri. It is a tributary of the One Hundred and Two River.

Mozingo Creek has the name of John Mozingo, a pioneer settler.

See also
List of rivers of Missouri

References

Rivers of Nodaway County, Missouri
Rivers of Missouri